John Haworth (9 March 1883 – 1955) was an English footballer who played in the Football League for Stoke.

Career
Haworth played amateur football with Colne racking up an impressive number of goals which led to Football League side Stoke signing him in 1903. However, he was never able to break into the first team and made six appearances scoring twice before joining Netherfield.

Career statistics

References

English footballers
Stoke City F.C. players
Kendal Town F.C. players
English Football League players
1883 births
1955 deaths
Colne F.C. players
Association football forwards